TV Oranje (English: TV Orange) is a Dutch music television channel aimed at the Dutch market which launched on 5 October 2005. The programming consists mainly of music videos and music programs in the Dutch language. The main music genres are Nederpop and Levenslied. The channel was founded by Jur Bron and Gerard Ardesch and officially owned by their company TV Digitaal BV. Since 12 May 2016 it is part of MuziekKiosk.

See also
 Television in the Netherlands
 Digital television in the Netherlands

References

External links
 www.tvoranje.nl

Television channels in the Netherlands
Television channels in Flanders
Television channels in Belgium
Television channels and stations established in 2005